Apata Sadunu Ape Lokaya is a 2021 Sri Lankan Sinhala children's adventure thriller film directed by Lal Priyadeva as his 16th directorial venture and produced by Sunil T. Fernando for Sunil T. Films as his 72nd film production. It stars child artist Pankaja Chandev in lead role and popular artists Menaka Rajapakse, Nehara Peiris, and Rajiv Nanayakkara made supportive roles. Late film star, Baptist Fernando's granddaughter Kavitha Anjali, made her debut cinema acting in the film. 
Filming began in 2019. The shootings took place in Deraniyagala, Galigamuwa, Navugala and Harigala. The premiere was held on the 14 February 2021 at 6.30 pm at the Liberty Cinema Hall, Kollupitiya. Due to being Sunil T's 72nd production, the film was released in 72 cinemas island wide.

Plot
There is a young mother, a father and a child. They people are going to Polonnaruwa for a picnic along with their maid. On the way, the vehicle veered off the road and overturned into a jungle. Father, mother and maid are killed by the animals, and the boy escapes. The child grows up with wild animals.

Controversy
This film has made a stir among Sri Lankans due to the alleged use of copyrighted materials from another movie called Mowgli: Legend of the Jungle. Movie fans have gathered and started contacting Warner Bros. and Netflix who owns the original materials of Mowgli: Legend of the Jungle movie.

When inquired about the said allegations, producer of the movie stated that there have been no piracy occurred and no samples were taken from the movie The Jungle Book (2016 film).

Cast
 Pankaja Chandev
 Menaka Rajapakse as Thejas
 Nehara Peiris as Nilu
 Rajiv Nanayakkara as Lawyer
 Rajitha Rodrigo
 Lakshmi Bogoda
 Thilina Lakmal
 Priya Selvam
 Raji Mendis
 Kavitha Anjali

References

External links
 Apata Sadunu Ape Lokaya official trailer on YouTube

2020s Sinhala-language films
2021 films
2021 thriller films
Sri Lankan thriller films